Jenness State Beach is a small state park located on the Atlantic Ocean in the town of Rye, New Hampshire. The park offers swimming at a sandy beach with a bathhouse and picnicking. The parking lot can accommodate 67 cars.

References

External links
Jenness State Beach New Hampshire Department of Natural and Cultural Resources

State parks of New Hampshire
Parks in Rockingham County, New Hampshire
Rye, New Hampshire
Beaches of New Hampshire
Protected areas established in 1980
1980 establishments in New Hampshire